Slippery Rock University, formally Slippery Rock University of Pennsylvania (The Rock or SRU), is a public university in Slippery Rock, Pennsylvania. SRU is a member of the Pennsylvania State System of Higher Education (PASSHE). The university has been coeducational since its founding in 1889.

History 
Slippery Rock University was founded in 1889 under the name Slippery Rock State Normal School as a teacher training school. James E. Morrow was the first president. The school was purchased by the Commonwealth in 1926 and became a four-year college.

Slippery Rock State College was established in 1960 and issued undergraduate and graduate degrees within the liberal arts and other professions. , Slippery Rock University has 8,876 enrolled students as well as 160 majors, almost 40 minors and over 30 graduate programs.

Administration
In 2012, Cheryl Joy Norton was appointed as the university's first female president. Norton announced she would retire effective June 30, 2017. William J. Behre became the university's president in 2018.

Athletics
Slippery Rock University of Pennsylvania competes in the NCAA Division II and is a member of the Pennsylvania State Athletic Conference (PSAC).

Slippery Rock University's official mascot is Rocky the lion, The Pride of The Rock.

Varsity sports
Men's teams:
Baseball, 
basketball,
cross country,
football,
soccer,
indoor track & field, and
outdoor track & field.

Women's teams:
Basketball,
cross country,
field hockey,
lacrosse,
soccer,
softball,
tennis,
indoor track & field,
outdoor track & field, and
Volleyball.

The announcement of Slippery Rock's football scores is a tradition at University of Michigan Football games, started in 1959 by Michigan Stadium's public address announcer Steve Filipiak. The tradition spread to other stadiums as well - during a 1970 game at the University of Texas, the announcer failed to read Slippery Rock’s score, which resulted in the crowd demanding to know said score. Slippery Rock was so popular with U of M fans that on September 29, 1979, they played in-state rival Shippensburg at Michigan Stadium, in front of 61,143 fans, a record for a Division II football game (Shippensburg won, 45–14). Slippery Rock played a second game at "The Big House" in 1981, attracting 36,719 fans in a 14–13 loss to Wayne State University. Slippery Rock made a third trip to "The Big House" on October 18, 2014, losing to Mercyhurst University, 45–23; a crowd of 15,121 braved a chilly wind to witness the contest.

Club sports

In 1995, the women's water polo team won the intercollegiate national championship conducted by USA Water Polo.  This remains the only collegiate water polo championship ever won by a non-California team.

In 1987, the women's judo team, a varsity sport team at the time, won the intercollegiate national championship conducted by the National Collegiate Judo Association.

Slippery Rock ice hockey joined other colleges and universities in the region to form the College Hockey Mid-America (CHMA) in 2006. In 2020, the university suspended the hockey program for four years.

Student life

Aebersold Student Recreation Center

Fraternities and sororities
Interfraternity Council Fraternities:
Sigma Tau Gamma (1961 – rechartered 1993, as of 2019 currently suspended for 5 years)
Theta Xi (1966 – rechartered 1987)
Alpha Sigma Phi (1970)
Pi Kappa Phi (1985)
Pi Kappa Alpha (1997, as of 2019 currently suspended for 3 years)
Kappa Sigma (2006)
Kappa Delta Rho (1981 – rechartered 2014)
Theta Chi (2018)

Panhellenic Association Sororities:
Sigma Sigma Sigma (1961)
Alpha Xi Delta (1963 – rechartered 1987)
Delta Zeta (1963)
Alpha Omicron Pi (1966)
Alpha Sigma Tau (1966)
Phi Sigma Sigma (1991)

Pan-Hellenic Council (NPHC) Organizations:
Alpha Kappa Alpha sorority
Zeta Phi Beta sorority
Delta Sigma Theta sorority
Phi Beta Sigma fraternity
Alpha Phi Alpha fraternity

Multicultural Greek Organizations:
 Theta Delta Sigma Society, Inc. (2010)

Student media
SRU has a student newspaper, Local Access TV Station, a PR Club, radio station, and a student-run literary publication.
The Rocket, a weekly newspaper with a circulation of 3,000
88.1 WSRU-FM, a 100-watt alternative rock station
WSRU-TV
SLAB, an annual student-run literary magazine publication.

Notable alumni
Matt Adams – professional baseball player
Janet Anderson – professional golfer
Cheryl Bailey – former general manager of U.S. Women's National Soccer, Commissioner of National Women's Soccer League
Francis V. Barnes – Secretary of Education for the Pennsylvania Department of Education from 2004 to 2005
David Batra – Swedish stand-up comedian and TV actor
Stephen Bolles – lawyer and politician
Myron Brown – professional basketball player
Todd Tamanend Clark (1983) – poet and composer 
Victoria Clarke – communications consultant and former United States Assistant Secretary of Defense for Public Affairs
Shardea Arias de la Cru - Paralympic administrator  
Matthew Driscoll ('92) – college basketball coach
Stanley Dziedzic ('72) – Olympic wrestler
Brandon Fusco – professional football player
Wes Hills – professional football player
Greg Hopkins – professional football player
Donnie Iris – professional musician
Charles William Kerr – Pioneer Presbyterian minister in Tulsa, Oklahoma
Jodi Kest – college basketball coach
Matt Kinsinger – professional football player
Gary L. Lancaster – Federal District Judge, Western District of Pennsylvania
Marcus Martin – professional football player
Brian Minto – professional boxer
Greg Paterra – professional football player
Sarah Patterson – college gymnastics coach
Lawrence Reed – president of the Foundation for Economic Education, former president of the Mackinac Center for Public Policy
M. Richard Rose (1955-2021) – former President of Alfred University and the Rochester Institute of Technology
Robert J. Stevens – chairman, president, and chief executive officer of the Lockheed Martin Corporation
C. Vivian Stringer – college basketball coach
John Stuper – professional baseball player and college baseball coach
Lou Trivino – professional baseball player
Royce Waltman – college basketball coach
Richard Schweiker – politician; former United States Senator from Pennsylvania (1969–1981) and former United States Secretary of Health and Human Services (1981–1983)

References

External links
Official website
Official athletics website

 
Educational institutions established in 1889
Universities and colleges in Butler County, Pennsylvania
Pennsylvania State System of Higher Education
Public universities and colleges in Pennsylvania
1889 establishments in Pennsylvania